Chundikkulam Lagoon is a lagoon in Jaffna District and Kilinochchi District, north-east Sri Lanka. The town of Chundikkulam is located on a narrow piece of land between the lagoon and the Indian Ocean. The lagoon is sometimes referred to as Elephant Pass Lagoon.

The lagoon is fed by a number of small rivers from the south, including Kanakarayan Aru, Netheli Aru and Theravil Aru. It used to be linked to Jaffna Lagoon but since the construction of the causeway at Elephant Pass the lagoon has in effect been a lake. The lagoon's water is brackish.

The lagoon is surrounded by palmyra palm plantations and scrubland. The land is used for prawn fishing and some salt production.

The lagoon has small areas of mangrove swamp and sea grass beds. The lagoon attracts a wide variety of water birds including storks, ibis, ducks, coot, gulls and tern.

Most of the lagoon was designated a bird sanctuary in 1938.

References

Bodies of water of Jaffna District
Bodies of water of Kilinochchi District
Lagoons of Sri Lanka